United is a 1984 video game published by Cases Computer Simulations Ltd.

Gameplay
United is a game in which the player manages and builds a fourth division football team, get them to win the league Championship.

Reception
Luke Renouf reviewed United for Imagine magazine, and stated that "it's a good and fairly difficult game which has an addictive quality that will keep you coming back for more."

References

External links
Review from Crash
Review in TV Gamer
Review in Sinclair User

1984 video games